The Forties Oil Field is the second largest oil field in the North Sea, after the Clair oil field, which is located 110 miles east of Aberdeen. It was discovered in 1970 and first produced oil in 1975 under ownership of British Petroleum, now called BP.

History
Production is from the Paleocene Forties Formation sandstones over a 90 km2 area making it a "giant oil field".

So marked the first and largest major oil field discovery in the United Kingdom sector of the North Sea. Oil had previously been discovered at the Ekofisk field.

Reservoir
The Forties Formation consists of a lower Shale Member and an upper Sandstone Member, which were deposited in a "middle and lower submarine fan environment". The initial development plan included a "complete replacement seawater injection system" starting in 1975.

Development

There are five fixed platforms around the field: Forties Alpha, Forties Bravo, Forties Charlie, Forties Delta and Forties Echo.  A riser platform, Forties Unity, lies further to the west and remained owned by BP as a strategic asset for accessing the Forties pipeline system without being dependent on the older access point, Forties Charlie. In April 2017, BP agreed to sell the pipeline to Ineos for a $125 million upfront payment and an additional $125 million in possible earnouts over 7 years.

In the late 1970s and early 1980s, BP was ubiquitous in the North Sea, owning or partnering with other firms to own the best and biggest fields in the North Sea. BP owned their own commercial deepsea diving company, Subsea International, which serviced their structures and pipelines as well as others worldwide.  BP owned a fleet of helicopters, including Sikorsky S-61s used for crew changes on their platforms.  The North Sea is typically too rough to make personnel transfers from a crewboat to a rig by basket or ladder, resulting in all crew changes being made by helicopter.  North Sea crews typically worked two weeks on, two weeks off.  Crews would often wait a day to a week to land on their platform, due to frequent dense fog which prevented landing on the 'Foggy Forties', a hazardous act even in clear weather. BP owned buildings near the airports around the North Sea to accommodate the crews while they were waiting or sometimes stranded in the Shetland Islands en route to the rigs from Aberdeen, Scotland.

The topsides for the Forties Echo and the associated fluid reception facilities on Forties Alpha were designed by Matthew Hall Engineering which was also responsible for procurement, fabrication , installation, hook-up and commissioning assistance. It was awarded the contract in August 1984. Initially there were facilities for 14 oil wells, and two spare slots. Construction details are shown in the following table.

No fluid processing was undertaken on Forties Echo, well fluids were transferred to Forties Alpha to yield 67,000 barrels of oil per day and 300,000 standard cubic metres of gas per day. Electric power was supplied from Forties Alpha and Delta. There is a 20 berth accommodation although the installation was intended to be unmanned. There are two modules with a topsides weight of 5,400 tonnes.

Production History
Named Forties because it lay just off the Long Forties Bank, the field began producing oil in September 1975 and was officially inaugurated by Her Majesty on 3 November 1975. When the project was completed, 400,000 barrels of crude was initially expected to be siphoned off each day and exported through a 36-inch pipeline to landfall at Cruden Bay north of Aberdeen. At peak production, this single field would provide the nation with about one-fifth of its total annual requirements by 1978.

The Forties field produced 41,704 barrels of oil and 10million cubic feet of associated gas per day during as of November 2013. It was the second highest producing field in the UK, after the Buzzard field. Production declined to 20,000 barrels of oil per day in 2021.

Renewal by Apache
The importance of the field has made it a status symbol in the North Sea.  When BP sold its 96% share in the field for $812 million in 2003, some traditionalists likened it to selling off the family silver.

APA Corporation, which bought the field, immediately initiated an intensive re-evaluation of the field and found a further , extending the field's life by at least twenty years, making the investment very profitable.
The field has been in production for 45 years but there appears to be no sign that it is nearing the end of its commercial life.
The field was originally scheduled to be retired in 2013, Apache expected that the production life of the field could be extended through further investment

References

External links
 The First UK Giant Oil Field
 APA Corporation
National Library of Scotland: Scottish Screen Archive (1970s documentary about the construction of 'Highland Two', the second of two major oil drilling and production structures for the Forties Field, at the Nigg yard of Highlands Fabricators)

BP oil and gas fields
North Sea oil fields
Oil fields of Scotland